is a 2014 Japanese animated action fantasy film based on the Pretty Cure franchise created by Izumi Todo. The film is directed by Kōji Ogawa, written by Yoshimi Narita, and produced by Toei Animation. The film was released in Japan on March 15, 2014.

Marking the sixth entry to the Pretty Cure All Stars crossover film series, as well as the final installment to the New Stage trilogy, the HappinessCharge PreCure! team joins the previous Pretty Cure teams in order to stop a dream-eating fairy.

Plot
EnEn and Grell from the Fairy Academy are tasked to investigate a new Pretty Cure team called HappinessCharge PreCure! team, and contacts the DokiDoki! PreCure team: Mana, Rikka, Alice, Makoto and Aguri to arrange a meeting. However, Glassun arrives and explains that Megumi and the other children are placed in a mysterious coma. With Blue's help, the girls and Hime enter the world of dreams, where they encounter Yumeta, a dream-eating fairy that are friends of EnEn and Grell. His mother, Māmu appears and cast the girls away from the Dream World, leaving EnEn and Grell's Pretty Cure book behind. Māmu later steals the book from Yumeta and ensnares and traps the Pretty Cures into their own dreams.

Realizing that Megumi and Hime aren't affected, they and the fairies infiltrate the Dream World to confront Māmu, but are later captured. Yumeta explains that his mother trapped the children in their dreams, just so that he wouldn't be alone in the Dream World. Megumi and Hime transforms and fights off Māmu's nightmares, and other Cures soon wake up from their dreams. With the power of the Miracle Lights and Blue's plead, the Cures join Lovely and Princess to the Dream World, and battles individual nightmares. With everyone's kind words, Yumeta conquers his fear and becomes a true dream-eater, and shows his mother the errors of her way. Māmu regains her senses, but are too weak to sends the nightmares away, and with EnEn and Grell's Miracle Lights, they summon Ayumi, and becomes her partner, who later transform into Cure Echo.

With the help of Echo, and Cure Honey, the Pretty Cures defeat the nightmare, allowing the children to wake up. As Yumeta promises to become a great dream-eater like his mother, EnEn and Grell writes about him, the HappinessCharge team, and Cure Echo.

Voice cast
HappinessCharge PreCure! cast
Megumi Nakajima as Megumi Aino/Cure Lovely
Megumi Han as Hime Shirayuki/Cure Princess
Naoko Matsui as Ribbon
Shouma Yamamoto as Blue

DokiDoki! PreCure cast
Hitomi Nabatame as Mana Aida/Cure Heart
Minako Kotobuki as Rikka Hishikawa/Cure Diamond
Mai Fuchigami as Alice Yotsuba/Cure Rosetta
Kanako Miyamoto as Makoto Kenzaki/Cure Sword
Rie Kugimiya as Aguri Madoka/Cure Ace
Kumiko Nishihara as Sharuru
Yuka Terasaki as Raquel
Ayaka Ōhashi as Lance
Yumi Uchiyama as Davi
Yuka Imai as Ai

Smile PreCure! cast
Misato Fukuen as Miyuki Hoshizora/Cure Happy
Hisako Kanemoto as Yayoi Kise/Cure Peace
Marina Inoue as Nao Midorikawa/Cure March

Suite PreCure cast
Ami Koshimizu as Hibiki Hojo/Cure Melody

HeartCatch PreCure! cast
Nana Mizuki as Tsubomi Hanasaki/Cure Blossom
Fumie Mizusawa as Erika Kurumi/Cure Marine

Fresh Pretty Cure! cast
Kanae Oki as Love Momozono/Cure Peach

Yes! PreCure 5 GoGo! cast
Yūko Sanpei as Nozomi Yumehara/Cure Dream
Junko Takeuchi as Rin Natsuki/Cure Rouge
Mariya Ise as Urara Kasugano/Cure Lemonade
Ai Nagano as Komachi Akimoto/Cure Mint
Ai Maeda as Karen Minazuki/Cure Aqua
Eri Sendai as Milk/Kurumi Mimino/Milky Rose

Futari wa Pretty Cure Splash Star cast
Orie Kimoto as Saki Hyuga/Cure Bloom/Cure Bright
Atsuko Enomoto as Mai Mishō/Cure Egret/Cure Windy

Futari wa Pretty Cure Max Heart cast
Yōko Honna as Nagisa Misumi/Cure Black
Yukana as Honoka Yukishiro/Cure White

Film characters
Sakiko Tamagawa as EnEn
Rikako Aikawa as Grell
Mamiko Noto as Ayumi Sakagami/Cure Echo
Konami Yoshida as Yumeta
Fumi Hirano as Māmu
Masako Nozawa as Nightmare Beasts
Masami Kikuchi as Nightmare Beast (final form)
Ayame Goriki as Nami

Production
In October 2013, it was announced that a new Pretty Cure All Stars film was in development, and will mark as the final installment to the New Stage trilogy. The film will feature all Pretty Cure teams, including HappinessCharge PreCure!. The key staff members from previous New Stage duology returned for the film: Kōji Ogawa is directing the film at Toei Animation, Yoshimi Narita is providing the screenplay, and Mitsuru Aoyama is designing the characters and providing the animation direction for the film. Actress Ayame Goriki was cast as one of the children, named Nami.

Release
The film was released in theaters in Japan on March 15, 2014.

Reception

Box office
The film debuted at number 3 out top 10 in the Japanese box office in its opening weekend, and later dropped to number 12 in its sixth weekend.

References

External links

2010s Japanese films
2014 anime films
Pretty Cure films
Toei Animation films
Japanese magical girl films
Crossover anime and manga
Films scored by Yasuharu Takanashi